Valu Kash (also Romanized as Valū Kash) is a village in Kaseliyan Rural District, in the Central District of Savadkuh County, Mazandaran Province, Iran. At the 2006 census, its population was 103, in 27 families.

References 

Populated places in Savadkuh County